Nomads is a 1986 American horror film written and directed by John McTiernan, adapted from the novel by Chelsea Quinn Yarbro. It stars Pierce Brosnan, Lesley-Anne Down, and Anna Maria Monticelli.  The story involves a French anthropologist who is an expert on nomads. He stumbles across a group of urban nomads who turn out to be more than he expected.

Plot 
Jean-Charles Pommier, a French anthropologist, dies violently and painfully. The moment he dies in the emergency room of a Los Angeles city hospital, the physician treating him, Dr. Eileen Flax, becomes possessed with his memories.  Dr. Flax relives the last week of Pommier's life until the moment of his death.

After travelling abroad and studying the religious beliefs and spiritual rituals of non-Western cultures, Pommier finally settles down with his patient wife Niki in Los Angeles to teach at UCLA. His home in the suburbs is vandalized one night by a gang of street punks who travel about in a black van. They are very interested in his house, and he finds that they have built a macabre shrine in his garage to a murderer who recently killed two girls who lived in the house. He studies them because their subculture exhibits similarities to the ones he has studied.

He begins to observe them, following them and covertly photographing them. He develops the pictures and is puzzled to find that they do not show up in them. He realizes that they are actually the Einwetok, demonic Inuit trickster spirits that take human form, commit acts of violence and mischief, and who are attracted to places of violence and death. They become aware of him, so they plan to claim his soul to keep their existence a secret.

Dr. Flax wakes in the bedroom of Pommier's house in the arms of his wife. They try to flee the city to escape the nomads, but the street fills with an army of leather-clad bikers and punks. They storm the house, forcing the women to flee to the attic. One of the nomads, Dancing Mary, breaks into the attic but leaves after scaring them.

Much later, the nomads have left the house, and the women leave the attic to find everything in the house destroyed. Upon packing their bags, they flee the city.  The next day, as they are driving down a back road, a leather-clad man on a motorcycle rides around them. Flax warns Niki that whatever she sees, she should not stop. As they drive past them, they are horrified to see that it is Pommier, who is now one of the nomads.

Cast
 Pierce Brosnan as Jean Charles Pommier, a French anthropologist
 Lesley-Anne Down as Dr. Eileen Flax, an ER doctor
 Anna-Maria Monticelli as Veronique "Niki" Pommier
 Adam Ant as Number One, a Nomad
 Mary Woronov as Dancing Mary, a Nomad
 Nina Foch as Real estate agent
 Frances Bay as Bertril, a nun
 Frank Doubleday as Razors, a Nomad
 Josie Cotton as Silver Ring, a Nomad
 Jeannie Elias as Cassie
 Hector Mercado as Ponytail, a Nomad

Production
Gérard Depardieu was considered to be the lead before role went to Brosnan. It was Brosnan's first lead role in a film, and he welcomed the opportunity to play a character so different from Remington Steele.

Lesley-Anne Down was paid $250,000 and was cast by producer Elliott Kastner. She says that McTiernan "was exceptionally hostile toward me... He didn’t want me anywhere near that film. He wanted to go more Hitchcockian and have 
some blonde, Yankee whatever." She says that he was having an affair with Anna-Maria Monticelli. Down thought some of the film "was very  good, and some of it was plainly f**king stupid. I believe, had he gone for more of a supernatural or ghostly situation, and not so much "Here are these people who do this", it would have been a better film.  But making it all a reality didn't work. He should have made it a straight-up supernatural horror film, and then it would have been good."

Critical reception
The film has earned a 33% approval rating on film review aggregate Rotten Tomatoes based on 12 reviews. The average rating is 4.5/10.

Jay Scott of The Globe and Mail described Nomads as "a breathlessly unself-conscious film (there is none of the self-congratulatory stylization of Blood Simple), the tone alternates maniacally between scaring the audience and making it giggle. Until the end. And then, via one of the funniest, cleverest and most unexpected conclusions to any movie in history, Nomads comes off the fence it has been sitting on with a bravura jump." Scott credited director John McTiernan, noting that "he has brought to his project a staggeringly resourceful technique. The sharply unpredictable editing, the hypnotic use of slow motion and rack focus (that's when the background and foreground reverse in clarity), the ominous rock music – everything adds up to a debut of singular confidence, full of fun and creepiness."  Roger Ebert of the Chicago Sun-Times rated it 1.5/4 stars and wrote that even if viewers cared about the characters, the film is too confusing to understand.  Variety wrote, "Nomads avoids the more obvious ripped-guts devices in favor of dramatic visual scares. [...]  In fact, everything seems to come naturally in a tale that even has the supernatural ring true."  Walter Goodman of The New York Times called the Innuat "as menacing as the chorus from West Side Story".

In his memoir, Total Recall, Arnold Schwarzenegger stated that he was so impressed by the film's tense atmosphere made with a low budget that he hired John McTiernan to direct Predator.

See also
List of ghost films

References

External links 
 
  
  
 
 

1986 films
1986 horror films
1980s ghost films
1986 independent films
American supernatural horror films
American independent films
Atlantic Entertainment Group films
1986 directorial debut films
Films scored by Bill Conti
Films directed by John McTiernan
Films with screenplays by John McTiernan
Nomads
Films set in Los Angeles
Films produced by Elliott Kastner
1980s English-language films
1980s American films